Bruchia is a genus of haplolepideous mosses (Dicranidae) in the family Bruchiaceae.

The genus name of Bruchia is in honour of Philipp Bruch (1781–1847), a German pharmacist and bryologist born in Zweibrücken.

The genus was circumscribed by Christian Friedrich Schwägrichen in Sp. Musc. Suppl. Vol.2 (Issue 1) on page 91 in 1824.

Species

Bruchia aurea 
Bruchia bolanderi
Bruchia brevifolia
Bruchia brevipes
Bruchia carinata
Bruchia carolinae
Bruchia drummondii
Bruchia eckloniana
Bruchia elegans
Bruchia flexuosa
Bruchia fusca

Bruchia hallii
Bruchia hampeana
Bruchia microspora
Bruchia paricutinensis
Bruchia queenslandica
Bruchia ravenelii
Bruchia sinensis
Bruchia texana
Bruchia uruguensis
Bruchia vogesiaca

References

Dicranales
Moss genera